Deserters Canyon is a canyon on the Finlay River in the Northern Interior of British Columbia, Canada.  It is located just upstream (north) from the head of the Finlay Arm of Lake Williston, the reservoir created by WAC Bennett Dam on the lower Peace River.

The name refers to two men in the exploration party of Samuel Black in 1824 who deserted at this location during an expedition to find the headwaters of the Finlay, which is the North Fork of the Peace River.  Deserters Creek and Deserters Peak are in the same area and has the same name-origin.

References

Canyons and gorges of British Columbia
Northern Interior of British Columbia
History of British Columbia
Fur trade